Waruna Shantha (full name Gagabadawatta Arachilage Lakpriya Waruna Shantha; born 16 December 1980) is a former Sri Lankan cricketer. He was a right-handed batsman and right-arm medium-fast bowler who played for Lankan Cricket Club. He was born in Boralla.

Shantha made his cricketing debut during the 2005-06 Twenty20 Cup against Galle, though it was another 18 months before he made another appearance for the side, in the following season's competition.

Shantha's first-class debut came during the 2007–08 season, against Panadura Sports Club. He played seven matches in the competition, scoring 151 runs, and making a top score of 60 runs, the only first-class half-century in his career.

He continued to play for the side in the Premier Limited Overs Tournament until the 2009–10 season.

References

External links
Waruna Shantha at Cricket Archive 
Waruna Shanta at Cricinfo

1980 births
Living people
Sri Lankan cricketers
Lankan Cricket Club cricketers